Abraham Allard (8 January 1676, Amsterdam - 26 January 1725, Amsterdam) was a Dutch map engraver active in Amsterdam.

Maps

References

External links
http://www.biografischportaal.nl/persoon/56255294
http://data.bnf.fr/14968917/abraham_allard/
http://www.npg.org.uk/collections/search/person/mp91445/abraham-allard

1676 births
1725 deaths
Engravers from Amsterdam